Pictured Rocks National Lakeshore is a U.S. National Lakeshore in the Upper Peninsula of Michigan, United States. The park has extensive views of the hilly shoreline between Munising and Grand Marais in Alger County, with picturesque rock formations, waterfalls, and sand dunes.

Pictured Rocks derives its name from the 15 miles (24  km) of colorful sandstone cliffs northeast of Munising. The cliffs reach up to 200 feet (60 m) above lake level. They have been naturally sculptured into a variety of shallow caves, arches, and formations resembling castle turrets and human profiles. Near Munising, visitors can also visit Grand Island, most of which are included in the separate Grand Island National Recreation Area.

The U.S. Congress designated Pictured Rocks the first National Lakeshore in the United States in 1966. It is governed by the National Park Service (NPS), with 22 year-round NPS employees as of May 2006, and received 1,313,179 visitors in 2021.

Geology 

The colors in the cliffs are created by the large amounts of minerals in the rock. The cliffs are composed of the Munising Formation of 500-million-year-old Cambrian Period sandstone. The Munising Formation sits atop Precambrian sandstone of the Jacobsville Formation. The mottled red Jacobsville Formation is the oldest rock in the park. On top of the Munising Formation, acting as a cap over the other layers is the hard sandstone of the younger Au Train Formation from the Ordovician Period. Streaks on the face of the cliffs come from groundwater leaching out of the rock and evaporating, leaving streaks of iron (red), manganese (black-white), limonite (yellow-brown), copper (pink-green), and other minerals.

History 
Although the Pictured Rocks shore waters are a rich fishing ground, the sandstone cliffs are dangerous to canoes and other open boats skirting the coastline. In 1658, the fur trader Pierre Esprit Radisson made this risky passage and noted that his Native American companions made an offering of tobacco to the local spirit of the cliffs.

During the Romantic Era of the 1800s, a series of American writers described their feelings upon sight of the Pictured Rocks.  Geologist and US Indian Agent Henry Rowe Schoolcraft visited in 1820 and remarked upon "some of the most sublime and commanding views in nature". In 1850, George Copway Kah-Ge-Ga-Gah-Bow, a Mississaugas Ojibwa writer and Methodist missionary, published The Traditional History and Characteristic Sketches of the Ojibway Nation, in which he cited the detailed description of the Pictured Rock by General Lewis Cass. Around 1850, developers planned a tourist resort, Grand Island City, adjacent to the Pictured Rocks near the current site of Munising.

After the lumbering era ended around 1910, much of the land making up the current National Lakeshore reverted to the state of Michigan for unpaid property taxes.  Eager for federal help and recognition, the state cooperated with the federal government in the region's redevelopment. In October 1966, Congress passed a bill authorizing the establishment of the Pictured Rocks National Lakeshore " to preserve for the benefit, inspiration, education, recreational use, and enjoyment of the public, a significant portion of the diminishing shoreline of the United States and its related geographic and scientific features." This was America's first National Lakeshore.

On April 13, 2006, one of the named rock formations collapsed: the Inner Turret of Miner's Castle in the Munising Formation. The collapse was reported via cell phone by fishermen in the area, according to chief ranger Larry Hach. Miners Castle consists of crumbly cross-bedded sandstone poorly cemented by secondary quartz, according to Research Ecologist Walter Loope of the U.S. Geological Survey. Rockfalls along the cliffs typically occur in the spring and fall due to freezing-thawing action.

On March 30, 2009, the Omnibus Public Land Management Act was signed into law, protecting  of Pictured Rocks as the Beaver Basin Wilderness, spanning the 13 miles of shoreline.

Representation in other media
In 2010, singer Kid Rock filmed the video for his song "Born Free" at the Pictured Rocks National Lakeshore.

In early 2014, Courtney Kotewa's snapshot of kayakers passing under a rock arch at the Pictured Rocks National Lakeshore was chosen as the grand prize winner of 2013 Share the Experience photo contest, sponsored by the National Park Foundation.

Access and accessibility

Munising, on the western end of the lakeshore, is accessed by M-28 and M-94.  Grand Marais, on the eastern end, is reached by M-77.

Paved highways penetrate the Lakeshore from both ends, connected by County Road H-58.  Roads come close to the shoreline only near Miners Castle, 12 Mile Beach, and the Grand Sable Dunes. The rest of the shoreline is seen from land only by hiking. A 42-mile (67-km) section of the North Country Trail spans the lakeshore. A permit is needed for backcountry camping, which is allowed along many miles of the National Lakeshore. This means that dispersed camping is not allowed in the park. 

Many boat companies offer daily trips along the lakeshore from Memorial Day weekend through the fall season.  Sea kayaking is another popular way to explore the park. While this may be the best way to see the natural formations, it is a strenuous trip in cold, dangerous water, not to be undertaken lightly or without proper equipment. Guides are available. The most efficient port of entry for kayaks is from Miner's Beach or the harbor at Munising. In addition, pontoons can be cheaply rented locally.

Winter sports activities include cross-country skiing, snowshoeing, snowmobiling, ice climbing, and ice fishing.

The administrators of Pictured Rocks have worked to make much of its rugged environment wheelchair accessible. Features include:

 Interagency Visitor Center, Munising Falls Interpretive Center, and Miners Castle Information Station in Munising
 Grand Sable Visitor Center in Grand Marais
 Each drive-in campground has at least one handicapped-accessible campsite with an extended picnic table, boardwalk, pedestal fire grate, and nearby restroom
 Log Slide overlook
 Miners Castle overlooks (except lower overlook trail, which includes stairs and is steep)
 Munising Falls viewing platform, with a paved trail
 Boardwalk at Sand Point Marsh Trail, with large-print guide
 Sand Point Beach parking with paved sidewalks, fully accessible picnic site, and boardwalk toward Lake Superior

Points of interest

From the west (Munising) to the east (Grand Marais):

 Munising Falls, Interpretive Center
 Sand Point, National Lakeshore Headquarters
 Munising Coast Guard Station Boathouse Museum
 Miners Castle rock formation, paved road to overlook (suffering major rockfall April 13, 2006)
 Miners River, emptying into Lake Superior near Miners Beach.
 Miners Falls interpretive trail
 Grand Portal Point rock formations
 Mosquito Falls
 Mosquito River
 Chapel Rock
 Chapel Falls
 Beaver Basin Wilderness
 Twelvemile Beach
 Shipwrecks
 White Birch Forest
 Au Sable Point, Au Sable Light
 Log Slide
 Grand Sable Dunes
 Grand Sable Lake
 Sable Falls, Interpretive Center

Waterfalls

Pictured Rocks is the site of many of Michigan's waterfalls. Most of the waterfalls resulted from water running over the cliffs of the Munising Formation. Pets are not allowed on most of the trails.

 Munising Falls—A  waterfall over a sandstone cliff. Along the trail may be seen ferns, wildflowers, and an occasional mink. The trail is fully accessible to people with disabilities and dogs are allowed.
 Miners Falls—This self-guiding interpretive trail passes Miners Basin and ends at Miners Falls.  There are 77 steps leading down to the viewing platform.  The falls drops  over the sandstone outcrop.
 Bridalveil Falls—Bridalveil is a seasonal waterfall.  In the summer, it may not exist or be only a trickle. 
 Mosquito Falls—This falls drops over an  rock shelf on the Mosquito River. River otters and beavers live in the stream along the trail.
 Chapel Falls—Two viewing platforms along the way provide views of the scenic Chapel Basin. Chapel Falls cascades some  down the sandstone cliffs on its way to Chapel Lake.
 Spray Falls—This waterfall is best seen from Lake Superior.
 Sable Falls - Sable Falls tumbles  over several cliffs of Munising and Jacobsville sandstone formations on its way to Lake Superior.

Grand Sable Dunes
The Grand Sable Dunes, at the eastern end of the Lakeshore, are a perched dune formation.  Sand washed ashore by wave action was then blown upslope by northerly prevailing winds until it came to rest atop a glacial moraine.  The Grand Sable Dunes today form a five-mile-long sand slope that rises from Lake Superior at a 35° angle.  The summits of the tallest dunes are as high as 275 feet (85 m) above lake level.

Glacial melt during the last major advance/retreat called the Marquette Readvance created the conditions for the formation of the Grand Sable Banks. Dominant northwesterly winds eventually caused blowing sand to become perched on the banks. Today, the Grand Sable Banks rise to heights of up to 300 ft. at a 35-degree angle from the shore of Lake Superior. The Grand Sable Dunes perched on top of these banks offers a desolate sandscape with jack pine forest near the edges.  

In the late 19th century, loggers in the area built a wooden log slide from the top of the dunes at the Grand Sable Banks to Lake Superior below to facilitate the transportation of timber from the area. The location is a popular spot to view the Grand Banks and climb on the dunes. Visitors may also take a trail from the Grand Sable Visitors Center near the eastern end of the dunes or stop along a section of the dunes that border on Grand Sable Lake.

Recreational activities 
Pictured Rocks National Lakeshore offers a variety of recreational opportunities for visitors year-round, including hiking, back-country camping, kayaking, boating, swimming, scuba diving, fishing, and winter activities including snowmobiling, ice climbing, and cross-country skiing. The beautiful scenery, and variety of opportunities to enjoy the park attract significant visitors, including a record 800,000 in 2018.

Boating and kayaking 

The colored rock formations attract kayakers and boat tours during the summer, as visitors flock to see the varied rock formations and colored rocks. Due to the danger of kayaking on the water near the cliffs, specialized equipment for sea-kayaking and knowledge are required to safely paddle near the cliffs.

Scuba diving 
Pictured Rocks National Lakeshore is a popular scuba diving destination in the Midwest and country, as the turbulent waters of Lake Superior have created many shipwrecks to explore over the years. A popular destination is the Alger Underwater Preserve.

Winter sports 

Due to the lake-effect snow, Pictured Rocks and the Munising area have some of the highest snowfall across the country. This snowfall creates the perfect opportunity for snowmobilers, with dedicated snowmobile and cross-country ski trails in the park. Additionally, the long winter and constant runoff from snowmelt create one of the best ice-climbing opportunities in the country, with over 50 named ice formations. Ice climbing in Michigan attracts climbers from across the Midwest, the country, and even internationally. Additionally, the ice formations attract visitors to sightsee and explore the interesting ice features.

Climate and weather

References

Further reading

 Stonehouse, Frederick. Dangerous Coast: Shipwrecks of Pictured Rocks, Avery Color Studios, June 1997. .

External links

 NPS Site
 UP Trails Guide
 Accessibility information from The Disabled Traveler's Companion
 Michigan Interactive Tour of Pictured Rocks fishweb.com
 Flickr photos of Pictured Rocks 

 
National Park Service areas in Michigan
Protected areas of Alger County, Michigan
Cliffs of the United States
Dunes of Michigan
Landforms of Alger County, Michigan
Cambrian Michigan
Landmarks in Michigan
Protected areas established in 1966
1966 establishments in Michigan